Rivington in the Borough of Chorley, Lancashire, is situated on the edge of the West Pennine Moors, at the foot of Rivington Pike overlooking reservoirs created for Liverpool Corporation Waterworks in the 19th century. There are twenty eight listed buildings within Rivington, two are classified by English Heritage as Grade II*, the rest as Grade II; Rivington has no Grade I Listed buildings.

Rivington village is a conservation area, designated under section 69 of the Planning (Listed Buildings and Conservation Areas) Act 1990; almost half the houses in the village centre have listed status. Rivington's buildings are varied, reflecting its rural and historic nature, and include former hand-loom weavers' cottages, the church, and the chapel. Locally sourced stone for walls and slate for roofs are the predominant building materials, used for places of worship, the school, houses (including many not listed), and boundary dry stone walls. An exception is Fisher House, a three-storey Georgian rendered building.

Rivington Hall, a former manor house with an imposing red brick Georgian frontage, is a short distance from the village centre. Its barn, and the barn at Great House Farm were renovated and converted by the architect Jonathan Simpson for William Lever in 1904. The barns were used for catering for the early tourist industry, a function they retain today. Farmhouses and their barns scattered outside the village centre, also built in local gritstone, are also listed.

Most of the remaining listed structures are in the listed historic landscape of Lever Park, a country park created for William Lever by Thomas Mawson in the early 20th century, the park includes Rivington Pike summit and the Pike tower, built in 1733 for Robert Andrews. 
. They include an unfinished replica of Liverpool Castle, overlooking the Lower Rivington Reservoir. Outside the park on the hillside are the terraced gardens, being the remains of Leverhulmes private gardens in his country retreat, once used for sport of shooting. The latter includes the Pigeon Tower, which is a large folly and former dovecote.

The term "listed building", in the United Kingdom, refers to a building or structure designated as being of special architectural, historical, or cultural significance. They are categorised in three grades: Grade I consists of buildings of outstanding architectural or historical interest, Grade II* includes significant buildings of more than local interest and Grade II consists of buildings of special architectural or historical interest. Buildings in England are listed by the Secretary of State for Culture, Media and Sport on recommendations provided by English Heritage, which also determines the grading.

Key

Listed buildings and structures

References

Bibliography

Further reading

Rivington
Rivington